Mislav Brzoja (born January 1, 1994) is a Croatian professional basketball player for Široki of the Basketball Championship of Bosnia and Herzegovina and ABA League Second Division. Standing at 1.98 m, he plays at the small forward position.

Playing career 
In 2016, Brzoja signed for Zadar.

After spending three seasons in Zadar, in September 2019, he signed with Gorica.

In September 2020, Brzoja returned to Dubrava.

In December 2020, Brzoja signed with Sutjeska of the Montenegrin League and ABA League Second Division. On September 12, 2021, Brzoja signed with Atomerőmű SE of the Nemzeti Bajnokság I/A.

In July 2022, Brzoja signed a one-year contract with Široki of the Basketball Championship of Bosnia and Herzegovina and ABA League Second Division.

References

External links
 Mislav Brzoja Basketball Player Profile on Eurobasket.com
 Mislav Brzoja Basketball Player Profile on RealGM.com
 Mislav Brzoja Basketball Player Profile on aba-liga.com

1994 births
Living people
ABA League players
Croatian expatriate basketball people in the United States
Croatian men's basketball players
Evansville Purple Aces men's basketball players
KK Zadar players
KK Gorica players
KK Sutjeska players
Small forwards
Basketball players from Zagreb
Villanova Wildcats men's basketball players
KK Dubrava players
Atomerőmű SE players